Cohen's Fashion Optical (formerly known as Cohen's Optical) is an optical retailer headquartered in New York City featuring fashion products such as eyeglasses, frames and sunglasses, lenses, contact lenses, and accessories.  Professional eye exams are usually available with on-site Doctors of Optometry.

History
The company's first retail store was established in 1924 in New York City. The brand name "Cohen's Fashion Optical" was adopted by Jack Cohen in 1926. In 1927, Cohen started to sell a wide variety of eyewear from a pushcart in Orchard Street, New York. Cohen's is a franchise operated company since 1978. In 2008, the estimated annual revenue was $121 million, however this amount may vary. Cohen's Fashion Optical was the first to offer on-premise eye examinations with qualified Doctors of Optometry.

On March 3, 2008, Houchens Industries completed its acquisition of Cohen's with hopes of expanding the regional optical retail chain into a national chain. The current president, Robert Cohen remained as president of the Cohen's division within Houchens.

Products
Cohen's Fashion Optical predominantly sells prescription or non-prescription eyewear, as well as contact lenses and sunglasses in the latest European and American eyewear styles. Many featured products includes brands such as Prada, Calvin Klein, Gucci, Polo Ralph Lauren, Dior, and Ray-Ban.

In addition to the above products, Cohen's also offers warranties on the glasses that they sell, to cover damage to the glasses. In April 2016, Cohen's Fashion Optical rolled out their private label collection, aimed to target the younger demographic with $99 price point glasses.

References

External links
 Cohen's Fashion Optical website
 A Cohen's Boston location
 Cohen's featured in New York Magazine

American companies established in 1924
Retail companies established in 1924
Eyewear retailers of the United States
Eyewear companies of the United States
2008 mergers and acquisitions